Erfangping Township is a rural township in Cili County, Hunan Province, People's Republic of China.

Administrative division
The township is divided into 11 villages, the following areas: Erfangping Village, Huangshaping Village, Xinjian Village, Qingye Village, Dongsheng Village, Shuanglian Village, Dongtan Village, Zhanjiaqiao Village, Shengde Village, Gaoxi Village, and Yanwu Village (二坊坪村、黄沙坪村、新建村、青叶村、东升村、双联村、洞潭村、占甲桥村、盛德村、高溪村、岩屋村).

References

Divisions of Cili County